Dhu Al-Qutaysh is a sub-district located in Huth District, 'Amran Governorate, Yemen. Dhu Al-Qutaysh had a population of 1553 according to the 2004 census.

References 

Sub-districts in Huth District